Amazon Grimstad FK is a Professional Norwegian women's football club from Grimstad. It is named after the Amazons of Greek mythology.

It was founded in 1999 when the women's football section split from FK Jerv. The senior team currently plays in the Norwegian First Division following relegation from the Toppserien at the conclusion of the 2015 Toppserien.

Recent history
{|class="wikitable"
|-bgcolor="#efefef"
! Season
!
! Pos.
! Pl.
! W
! D
! L
! GS
! GA
! P
!Cup
!Notes
|-
|2006
|TS
|align=right |6
|align=right|18||align=right|7||align=right|2||align=right|9
|align=right|29||align=right|32||align=right|23
|3rd round
|
|-
|2007
|TS
|align=right |8
|align=right|22||align=right|7||align=right|5||align=right|10
|align=right|29||align=right|46||align=right|26
|quarter-final
|
|-
|2008
|TS
|align=right |8
|align=right|22||align=right|7||align=right|4||align=right|11
|align=right|30||align=right|45||align=right|25
|3rd round
|
|-
|2009
|TS
|align=right |10
|align=right|22||align=right|7||align=right|1||align=right|14
|align=right|14||align=right|33||align=right|22
|quarter-final
|
|-
|2010
|TS
|align=right |8
|align=right|22||align=right|9||align=right|2||align=right|11
|align=right|28||align=right|43||align=right|29
|quarter-final
|
|-
|2011
|TS
|align=right |7
|align=right|22||align=right|8||align=right|3||align=right|11
|align=right|33||align=right|42||align=right|27
|3rd round
|
|-
|2012
|TS
|align=right |10
|align=right|22||align=right|5||align=right|5||align=right|12
|align=right|25||align=right|35||align=right|20
|semi-final
|
|-
|2013
|TS
|align=right |11
|align=right|22||align=right|3||align=right|6||align=right|13
|align=right|22||align=right|39||align=right|15
|3rd round
|
|-
|2014
|TS
|align=right |11
|align=right|22||align=right|4||align=right|2||align=right|16
|align=right|18||align=right|59||align=right|14
|1st round
|
|-
|2015
|TS
|align=right bgcolor="#FFCCCC"| 12
|align=right|22||align=right|4||align=right|4||align=right|14
|align=right|22||align=right|50||align=right|15
|3rd round
|Relegated
|-
|2016
|D1
|align=right |10
|align=right|22||align=right|7||align=right|1||align=right|14
|align=right|23||align=right|55||align=right|22
|2nd round
|
|-
|2017
|D1
|align=right |9
|align=right|22||align=right|8||align=right|2||align=right|12
|align=right|31||align=right|47||align=right|26
|2nd round
|
|-
|2018
|D1
|align=right |6
|align=right|22||align=right|8||align=right|5||align=right|9
|align=right|37||align=right|38||align=right|29
|2nd round
|
|-
|2019 
|D1
|align=right |5
|align=right|22||align=right|11||align=right|1||align=right|10
|align=right|51||align=right|36||align=right|34
|3rd round
|
|-
|2020 
|D1
|align=right |7
|align=right|18||align=right|6||align=right|2||align=right|10
|align=right|25||align=right|38||align=right|20
|1st round
|
|}

2015 squad

References

External links
Official site

Women's football clubs in Norway
Association football clubs established in 1999
Sport in Aust-Agder
1999 establishments in Norway